Ladas of Aegium was an ancient Greek athlete listed by Eusebius of Caesarea as a victor in the stadion race of the 125th Olympiad (280 BC).

See also 
 Olympic winners of the Stadion race

References 

Ancient Olympic competitors
Ancient Achaean athletes
Sportspeople from Aigio
3rd-century BC Greek people